Wyatt Eaton, baptised Charles Wyatt Eaton, (May 6, 1849June 7, 1896) was a Canadian-American portrait and figure painter, remembered as one of the founders of the Society of American Artists.

Biography

Born in Philipsburg, Quebec, Lower Canada, Eaton was a student of the National Academy of Design, New York, studying with Samuel Colman, Daniel Huntington and others. In 1872, he moved to Paris and studied at the École des Beaux-Arts under Jean-Léon Gérôme. During this time, he made the acquaintance of Jean-François Millet at Barbizon, and was also influenced by his friend Jules Bastien-Lepage to believe that his art should focus on rural life.

After his return to the United States in 1876, he painted a series of portraits of American poets for the Century magazine which were engraved by Timothy Cole (Eaton`s portrait of him is in the collection of the Art Gallery of Ontario). He became a teacher in the Cooper Institute, and opened a studio in New York City but returned to Montreal often to paint portraits. In 1880, he travelled to France and Italy. He became one of the founders of the American Art Association, later the Society of American Artists, of which he was the first secretary. He was also a founding member of the Society of Canadian Artists in Montreal (1867). Eaton died from tuberculosis at Newport, Rhode Island on June 7, 1896.

Works

1868 - Study of a Classical Bust, oil on canvas, National Gallery of Canada
1869 - Study after the Antique, c. 1869, oil on paper, National Gallery of Canada
1870 - Ann Letta Stanton Baker, oil on canvas, National Gallery of Canada
1870 - Arthur Henry Gilmour, oil on canvas, National Gallery of Canada
1870 - Farmer's Boy
1870 - John Baker, oil on canvas, National Gallery of Canada
1870 - John Carpenter Baker, oil on canvas, National Gallery of Canada
1870 - Mary Jane Baker Gilmour, oil on canvas, National Gallery of Canada
1870 - Lillian Krans, oil on canvas, Robert McLaughlin Gallery, Oshawa
1870 - Hiram Krans, oil on canvas, Robert McLaughlin Gallery, Oshawa
1873 - Landscape Sketch, oil on canvas, mounted on cardboard –National Gallery of Canada
1873 - Monsieur Coclèze, c. 1873, National Gallery of Canada
1873 - Portrait of a Man, National Gallery of Canada
1875 - Reverie, view
1876 - Harvesters at Rest
1877 - Haystacks at Barbizon, etching in brown on cream laid paper, National Gallery of Canada
1877 - Laure, etching on cream wove paper,National Gallery of Canada
1877 - Trees in the Forest of Fontainebleau, etching in brown on cream laid paper,National Gallery of Canada
1879 - Boy Whittling
1879 - Portrait of William Cullen Bryant, oil on canvas, Brooklyn Museum
1880 - Grandmother and Child
1881 - Portrait of a Lady (Mrs. W.W. Ladd Jr.?), charcoal on buff laid paper, National Gallery of Canada
1884 - The Shepherdess, oil on canvas, Owens Art Gallery, Mount Allison University
1884 - The Gleaner, pastel on buff laid paper, National Gallery of Canada
1885 - Timothy Cole, oil on canvas, 
1888 - Ariadne, oil on canvas, Smithsonian American Art Museum
1889 - William T. Evans, oil on canvas, Smithsonian American Art Museum
1894 - Sir William Van Horne, oil on canvas, National Gallery of Canada
 Lassitude, view

Portraits of Wyatt Eaton
 Portrait of Wyatt Eaton, c. 1878, J. Alden Weir, oil on canvas Smithsonian American Art Museum
 Self-portrait, 1879 Canadian gallery of Art

Notes

References
 Sherman, Frederic Fairchild, American Painters of Yesterday and Today, 1919, Priv. print in New York. Chapter: Figure Pictures by Wyatt Eaton: online
Attribution:

External links

Wyatt Eaton at Artcyclopedia.com
Wyatt Eaton at AskArt.com

19th-century American painters
American male painters
19th-century Canadian painters
Canadian male painters
19th-century deaths from tuberculosis
1849 births
1896 deaths
Tuberculosis deaths in Rhode Island
Canadian alumni of the École des Beaux-Arts
Canadian emigrants to the United States
American expatriates in France
19th-century American male artists
19th-century Canadian male artists